Vladik may refer to:

People
Samile the Vladik, bishop and witness to the Fall of Constantinople
 A nickname or short form for Vladislav
Vladik Dzhabarov, Soviet soldier and world-class cyclist
Vladik Faibishenko (died 1961), defendant in the Rokotov–Faibishenko case, a Soviet criminal trial in 1961 against financial speculators
Vladik Khachatryan, Nagorno-Karabakh politician
Vladik Kreinovich, Russian-American professor of computer science

Other
a colloquial name for Vladivostok, Russia
a colloquial name for Vladikavkaz, Russia